Gregory Michael Newton (born September 7, 1974) is a Canadian former professional basketball player. He played four years of college basketball at Duke University and served as team captain during his senior year.

College career
He was a center for the Duke Blue Devils men's basketball team from 1994 to 1997, playing for coach Mike Krzyzewski. Newton was team captain in his senior season. He averaged 7.6 points per game for his Duke career. His best NCAA season came in 1995-95 (12.2 points, 8.2 rebounds a game). Newton was suspended from Duke in 1995 for two semesters for cheating on a computer science exam.

Professional career
Newton began his professional with the USBL's Raleigh Cougars. The Cougars promoted him by citing his greatest accomplishment - at the time, he was one away from Duke's top 10 in blocks.

Newton went on to play professionally in several countries, including Belgium, Israel, Brazil, Argentina, Slovenia, Italy, Bulgaria, Serbia, Russia, Bosnia and Herzegovina and Spain.

In July 2011, Newton joined the coaching staff of the Brock University men's basketball team, serving as an assistant coach until 2013.

National team 
He was a member of the Canadian national team. At the 1998 World Championships, he led Canada in scoring (11.5 points per contest) and rebounding (10.1 rebounds per contest).

He finished seventh with Canada in the 2000 Summer Olympics in Sydney, Australia.

See also 
 List of foreign basketball players in Serbia

Notes

External links
Duke biography (archived from 1997)
FrozenHoops.com History of basketball in Canada. Selection of Top 100 Canadian players of all time

1974 births
Living people
Basketball people from Ontario
Basketball players at the 1999 Pan American Games
Basketball players at the 2000 Summer Olympics
Basketball players at the 2003 Pan American Games
Canadian expatriate basketball people in Belgium
Canadian expatriate basketball people in Serbia
Canadian expatriate basketball people in Spain
Canadian expatriate basketball people in the United States
Canadian expatriate sportspeople in Bosnia and Herzegovina
Canadian expatriate sportspeople in Brazil
Canadian expatriate sportspeople in Israel
Canadian men's basketball players
Canadian people of English descent
Centers (basketball)
Duke Blue Devils men's basketball players
Expatriate basketball people in Brazil
Flamengo basketball players
Gent Hawks players
Hapoel Eilat basketball players
HKK Široki players
Israeli Basketball Premier League players
KK Lavovi 063 players
Olympic basketball players of Canada
Pan American Games competitors for Canada
Scafati Basket players
Sportspeople from Niagara Falls, Ontario
1998 FIBA World Championship players